In enzymology, a (S)-N-acetyl-1-phenylethylamine hydrolase is an enzyme that catalyzes the chemical reaction

N-acetylphenylethylamine + HO  phenethylamine + acetate

Thus, the two substrates of this enzyme are N-acetylphenylethylamine and HO, whereas its two products are phenethylamine and acetate.

This enzyme belongs to the family of hydrolases, those acting on carbon-nitrogen bonds other than peptide bonds, specifically in linear amides.  The systematic name of this enzyme class is (S)-N-acetylphenylethylamine:HO hydrolase. At least one compound, phenylmethanesulfonylfluoride is known to inhibit this enzyme.

References

 

EC 3.5.1
Enzymes of unknown structure